Hydropsalis is a genus of nightjars in the family Caprimulgidae. The species are widely distributed across the tropical and subtropical regions of the New World.

Taxonomy
The genus Hydropsalis was introduced in 1832 by the German naturalist Johann Georg Wagler. The type species was designated by George Robert Gray in 1855 as Caprimulgus furcifer Vieillot 1817. This taxon is now considered as a subspecies of the scissor-tailed nightjar (Hydropsalis torquata). The genus name combines the Ancient Greek hudro- meaning "water-" with psalis meaning "pair of scissors".

The genus contains four species:
 Ladder-tailed nightjar (Hydropsalis climacocerca)
 Scissor-tailed nightjar (Hydropsalis torquata)
 Spot-tailed nightjar (Hydropsalis maculicaudus)
 White-tailed nightjar (Hydropsalis cayennensis)

References

 
Bird genera

Taxonomy articles created by Polbot